The following outline is provided as an overview of and topical guide to culture:

Culture – a set of patterns of human activity within a community or social group and the symbolic structures that give significance to such activity. Customs, laws, dress, architectural style, social standards, and traditions are all examples of cultural elements.  Since 2010, Culture is considered the Fourth Pillar of Sustainable Development by UNESCO. More: Agenda 21 for Culture or in short Culture 21.

Cultural groups 

 Community – a social unit of any size that shares common values. Communities range in size and scope from neighbourhoods to national communities to international communities. They can be physical (face-to-face) or virtual (online). 
 People – a plurality of persons considered as a whole, as is the case with an ethnic group or nation. Collectively, for example, the contemporary Frisians and Danes are two related Germanic peoples, while various Middle Eastern ethnic groups are often linguistically categorized as the Semitic people. See the list of contemporary ethnic groups for more examples. 
 Ethnic group – socially defined category of people who identify with each other based on common ancestral, social, cultural or national experience. Membership of an ethnic group tends to be defined by a shared cultural heritage, ancestry, origin myth, history, homeland, language and/or dialect, symbolic systems such as religion, mythology and ritual, cuisine, dressing style, physical appearance, etc.
 Society – a group of people involved in persistent interpersonal relationships, or a large social grouping sharing the same geographical or social territory, typically subject to the same political authority and dominant cultural expectations. Human societies are characterized by patterns of relationships (social relations) between individuals who share a distinctive culture and institutions; a given society may be described as the total of such relationships among its constituent members. 
 Civilization – any complex society characterized by urban development, social stratification, symbolic communication forms (typically, writing systems), and a perceived separation from and domination over the natural environment.

Elements of culture 
 The arts – vast subdivision of culture, composed of many creative endeavors and disciplines. The arts encompasses visual arts, literary arts and the performing arts.
 Clothing – Fashion, Jewelry
 Gastronomy – the art and science of good eating, including the study of food and culture.
 Food preparation – act of preparing foods for eating. It encompasses a vast range of methods, tools, and combinations of ingredients to improve the flavour and digestibility of food.
 Food and drink 
 Cuisines – a cuisine is a specific set of cooking traditions and practices, often associated with a specific culture.
 Chocolate – raw or processed food produced from the seed of the Mars Theobroma cacao tree.
 Wine – alcoholic beverage, made of fermented fruit juice, usually from grapes.
 Literature – the art of written works.
 Children's literature – stories, books, and poems for children.
 Fiction – any form of narrative which deals, in part or whole, with events that are not factual, but rather, imaginary and invented by its author(s). See below.
 Non-fiction – a form of any narrative, account, or other communicative work whose assertions and descriptions are understood to be factual.
 Poetry – literary art in which language is used for its aesthetic and evocative qualities in addition to, or instead of, its apparent meaning.
 Critical theory – examination and critique of society and culture, drawing from knowledge across the social sciences and humanities.
 Performing arts – those forms of art that use the artist's own body, face, and presence as a medium.
 Circus – performance of a company of clowns, acrobats, trained animals, trapeze artists, musicians, hoopers, tightrope walkers, jugglers, unicyclists and other object-manipulating and stunt-oriented artists, and a ringmaster.
 Comedy – any discourse or work generally intended to be humorous or to amuse by inducing laughter, especially in theatre, television, film and stand-up comedy.
 Stand-up comedy – performance by a comedian in front of a live audience, usually speaking directly to them.
 Dance – art form of movement of the body, usually rhythmic and to music, used as a form of expression, social interaction, or presented in a spiritual or performance setting.
 Film – moving pictures, the art form that records performances visually.
 Theatre – a collaborative form of fine art that uses live performers to present the experience of a real or imagined event before a live audience in a specific place.
 Music – an art form the medium of which is sound and silence.
 Music genres
 Jazz – a musical style that originated at the beginning of the 20th century in African American communities in the Southern United States, mixing African and European music traditions.
 Opera – an art form in which singers and musicians perform a dramatic work combining text (called a libretto) and musical score.
 Musical instruments – devices created or adapted to make musical sounds.
 Guitars – the guitar is a plucked string instrument, usually played with fingers or a pick. The guitar consists of a body with a rigid neck to which the strings, generally six in number, are attached. Guitars are traditionally constructed of various woods and strung with animal gut or, more recently, with either nylon or steel strings.
 Stagecraft – technical aspects of theatrical, film, and video production. It includes, but is not limited to, constructing and rigging scenery, hanging and focusing of lighting, design and procurement of costumes, makeup, procurement of props, stage management, and recording and mixing of sound.
 Visual arts – art forms that create primarily visual works.
 Architecture – The art and science of designing and erecting buildings and other physical structures.
 Classical architecture – the architecture of classical antiquity and later architectural styles influenced by it.
 Crafts – recreational activities and hobbies that involve making things with one's hands and skill.
 Design – the process for planning the overall look of an object
 Drawing – visual art that makes use of any number of drawing instruments to mark a two-dimensional medium.
 Film – moving pictures.
 Painting – the practice of applying paint, pigment, colour or another medium to a surface with a brush or other object.
 History of painting
 Photography – art, science, and practice of creating pictures by recording radiation on a radiation-sensitive medium, such as a photographic film, or electronic image sensors.
 Sculpture – three-dimensional artwork created by shaping or combining hard materials - typically stone such as marble - or metal, glass, or wood.
 Entertainment – any activity which provides a diversion or permits people to amuse themselves in their leisure time. Entertainment is generally passive, such as watching opera or a movie.
 Fiction –  any form of narrative which deals, in part or whole, with events that are not factual, but rather, imaginary and invented by its author(s).
 James Bond – fictional character created in 1953 by writer Ian Fleming. Since then, the character has grown to icon status, featured in many novels, movies, video games and other media.
 Fantasy – genre of fiction using magic and the supernatural as primary elements of plot, theme or setting, often in imaginary worlds, generally avoiding the technical/scientific content typical of Science fiction, but overlapping with it
 Middle-earth – fantasy setting by writer J.R.R. Tolkien, home to hobbits, orcs, and many other mystical races and creatures.
 Science fiction – a genre of fiction dealing with imaginary but more or less plausible (or at least nonsupernatural) content such as future settings, futuristic science and technology, space travel, aliens, and paranormal abilities.  Exploring the consequences of scientific innovations is one purpose of science fiction, making it a "literature of ideas."
 Games –  structured playing, usually undertaken for enjoyment, involving goals, rules, challenge, and interaction.
 Board games
 Chess – two-player board game played on a chessboard, a square-checkered board with 64 squares arranged in an eight-by-eight grid. Each player begins the game with sixteen pieces: One king, one queen, two rooks, two knights, two bishops, and eight pawns.
 Card games
 Poker – family of card games that share betting rules and usually (but not always) hand rankings.
 Video games – electronic games that involve interaction with a user interface to generate visual feedback on a video device.
 Performing arts – those forms of art that use the artist's own body, face, and presence as a medium. See above.
 Sports –  organized, competitive, entertaining, and skilful activity requiring commitment, strategy, and fair play, in which a winner can be defined by objective means. Generally speaking, a sport is a game based in physical athleticism.
 Ball games
 Baseball – bat-and-ball sport played between two teams of nine players each. The aim is to score runs by hitting a thrown ball with a bat and touching a series of four bases arranged at the corners of a ninety-foot diamond.
 Basketball – team sport in which two teams of five players try to score points by throwing or "shooting" a ball through the top of a basketball hoop while following a set of rules.
 Tennis – sport usually played between two players (singles) or between two teams of two players each (doubles), using specialized racquets to strike a felt-covered hollow rubber ball over a net into the opponent's court.
 Canoeing and kayaking – two closely related forms of watercraft paddling, involving manually propelling and navigating specialized boats called canoes and kayaks using a blade that is joined to a shaft, known as a paddle, in the water.
 Combat sports
 Fencing – family of combat sports using bladed weapons.
 Martial arts – extensive systems of codified practices and traditions of combat, practised for a variety of reasons, including self-defence, competition, physical health and fitness, as well as mental and spiritual development.
 Cycling sport – bicycle racing and track cycling.
 Motorcycling – riding a motorcycle. A variety of subcultures and lifestyles have been built up around motorcycling and motorcycle racing.
 Running – moving rapidly on foot, during which both feet are off the ground at regular intervals.
 Humanities – academic disciplines that study the human condition, using methods that are primarily analytical, critical, or speculative, as distinguished from the mainly empirical approaches of the natural sciences.
 Area studies  – comprehensive interdisciplinary research and the academic study of the people and communities of particular regions. Disciplines applied to include history, political science, sociology, cultural studies, languages, geography, literature, and related disciplines.
 Sinology – study of China and things related to China, such as its classical language and literature.
 Classical studies – a branch of the Humanities comprising the languages, literature, philosophy, history, art, archaeology and all other cultural elements of the ancient Mediterranean world (Bronze Age ca. BC 3000 – Late Antiquity ca. AD 300–600); especially Ancient Greece and Ancient Rome.
 Mass media – diversified media technologies and their content that are intended to reach a large audience by mass communication. Includes radio and television programming; mass publishing of books, magazines, and newspapers; web content; and films and audio recordings.
 Tradition – belief or behaviour passed down within a group or society with symbolic meaning or special significance with origins in the past. Common examples include holidays or impractical but socially meaningful clothes (like lawyer wigs or military officer spurs), but the idea has also been applied to social norms such as greetings.
 Celebration –
 Festivals – entertainment events centring on and celebrating a unique aspect of a community, usually staged by that community.
 Tourism – travel for recreational, leisure, or business purposes. The World Tourism Organization defines tourists as people "travelling to and staying in places outside their usual environment for not more than one consecutive year for leisure, business and other purposes." Tourism is important, and in some cases, vital for many countries. It was recognized in the Manila Declaration on World Tourism of 1980 as "an activity essential to the life of nations because of its direct effects on the social, cultural, educational, and economic sectors of national societies and their international relations."
 Tourist attraction – place of interest where tourists visit, typically for its inherent or exhibited natural or cultural value, historical significance, natural or built beauty, offering leisure, adventure and amusement. 
 Lists of tourist attractions

Types of cultures 
 Organizational culture – behaviour of humans within an organization and the meaning that people attach to those behaviours. An organization's culture includes its vision, values, norms, systems, countries, symbols, language, assumptions, beliefs, and habits.

Cultures by aspect 

 Consumer culture – a society based on consumerism
 High context culture – a culture with the tendency use high context messages, resulting in catering towards in-groups
 Low context culture – culture with a tendency not to cater towards in-groups
 Non-institutional culture - culture that is emerging bottom-up from self-organizing grassroot initiatives, rather than top-down from the state 
 Participatory culture – a culture in which private persons (the public) do not act as consumers only, but also as contributors or producers (prosumers)
 Permission culture – a society in which copyright restrictions are pervasive and enforced to the extent that any uses of copyrighted works need to be explicitly leased
 Remix culture – a society which allows and encourages derivative works
 Traditional culture – a community that chooses to remain focused on subsistence as a major cornerstone of their economic behaviour, as well as, adheres to their ancestral belief-systems and mannerism.

Cultural cross-sections 

 Animal culture – cultural phenomena pertaining to animals
 Children's culture – cultural phenomena pertaining to children
 Children's street culture – cumulative culture created by young children
 Coffee culture – social atmosphere or series of associated social behaviors that depends heavily upon coffee, particularly as a social lubricant 
 Culture of capitalism – the lifestyle of the people living within a capitalist society, and the effects of a global or national capitalist economy on a population
 Cyberculture – cultural phenomena pertaining to cyberspace
 DIY culture – refers to a wide range of elements in non-mainstream society, such as grassroots political and social activism, independent music, art, and film
 Dominant culture – the established language, religion, behavior, values, rituals, and social customs of a society
 Drinking culture – the customs and practices of people who drink alcoholic beverages
 Folk culture (Folklore) – traditional culture; traditional cultural traits of a community
 Low culture – non-transcendent; “not worth” studying or researching 
 High culture – “transcendent” in two ways: internationally and timeless
 Official culture 
 Political culture 
 Civic political culture 
 Popular culture – totality of ideas, perspectives, attitudes, memes, images and other phenomena that permeate the everyday lives of a given society, especially those heavily influenced by mass media.
 Print culture 
 Safety culture – the way in which safety is managed in the workplace, which often reflects "the attitudes, beliefs, perceptions and values that employees share in relation to safety."
 Tea culture 
 Trash culture 
 Urban culture 
 Vernacular culture 
 Women's culture (Cultural Feminism) 
 Youth culture - refers to the societal norms of children, adolescents, and young adults. Specifically, it comprises the processes and symbolic systems that are shared by the youth demographic and are distinct from those of adults in the community.

Subcultures

Subculture
 Lifestyle enclave

Types of cultures 
 Alternative culture

Specific subcultures 

 Association football culture 
 Cycling subculture – a culture that supports, encourages, and has high bicycle usage
 Deaf culture – social beliefs, behaviors, art, literary traditions, history, values and shared institutions of communities that are affected by deafness and which use sign languages as the main means of communication. When used as a cultural label, the word "deaf" is often written with a capital D, and referred to as "big D Deaf" in speech and sign.
 Ethical culture 
 Gun culture 
 Horse culture – a community whose day-to-day life revolves around the herding and breeding of horses
 LGBT culture 
 Modern juggling culture 
 Surf culture 
 Video game culture

Academic disciplines that study culture 
 Anthropology
 Cultural anthropology – branch of anthropology focused on the study of cultural variation.
 Archaeology – history studies in the physical aspects or artefacts of cultures.
 culture-historical archaeology
 Sociocultural evolution
 Biology
 Sociobiology
 Social neuroscience
 Cultural neuroscience
 Cultural history – an academic discipline that combines the approaches of anthropology and history to look at popular cultural traditions and cultural interpretations of historical experience. It examines the records and narrative descriptions of past knowledge, customs, and arts of a group of people.
 Cultural studies – an academic discipline that studies the forces from which the whole of humankind construct their daily lives. It seeks to understand how meaning is generated and disseminated through practices, beliefs, and political, economic, or social structures within a given culture.
 Ethnic studies
 Popular culture studies – generally considered a combination of communication studies and cultural studies, it analyzes popular culture from a critical theory perspective.
 Culturology – social science concerned with the scientific understanding, description, analysis and prediction of cultural activities.
 Culture theory – seeks to define the heuristic concept of culture in operational and/or scientific terms.
 Human geography – social science that studies the world, its people, communities, and cultures with an emphasis on relations of and across space and place.
 Philosophy of culture 
 Psychology
 Evolutionary psychology
 Cultural psychology
 Sociology – scientific study of human society. The traditional focuses of sociology have included social stratification, social class, culture, social mobility, religion, secularization, law, and deviance.
 Sociology of culture
 Sound culture – an interdisciplinary field which considers "the material production and consumption of music, sound, noise and silence, and how these have changed throughout history and within different societies, but does this from a much broader perspective than standard disciplines."
 Visual culture

Cultures of the worlds

Area studies 

Area studies
 Classical studies 
 Sinology

Cultures of continents and major geopolitical regions 
 (non-continents are italicized)

 Culture of Africa
 Culture of Antarctica
 Culture of Asia
 Culture of Europe
 Culture of North America
 Culture of Oceania
 Culture of Australia
 Culture of South America

Cultures by political divisions of the World 
(arranged by continent or major geopolitical region)

Cultures of Africa 

Culture of Africa
 West Africa
 Culture of Benin
 Culture of Burkina Faso
 Culture of Cape Verde
 Culture of Ivory Coast
 Culture of the Gambia
 Culture of Ghana
 Culture of Guinea
 Culture of Guinea-Bissau
 Culture of Liberia
 Culture of Mali
 Culture of Mauritania
 Culture of Niger
 Culture of Nigeria
 Culture of Senegal
 Culture of Sierra Leone
 Culture of Togo
 North Africa
 Culture of Algeria
 Culture of Egypt
 Culture of Libya
 Culture of Mauritania
 Culture of Morocco
 Culture of Sudan
 Culture of Tunisia
 Culture of Western Sahara
 Central Africa
 Culture of Angola
 Culture of Burundi
 Culture of Cameroon
 Culture of the Central African Republic
 Culture of Chad
 Culture of the Democratic Republic of the Congo
 Culture of Equatorial Guinea
 Culture of Gabon
 Culture of the Republic of the Congo
 Culture of Rwanda
 Culture of São Tomé and Príncipe
 East Africa
 Culture of Burundi
 Culture of Comoros
 Culture of Djibouti
 Culture of Eritrea
 Culture of Ethiopia
 Culture of Kenya
 Culture of Madagascar
 Culture of Malawi
 Culture of Mauritius
 Culture of Mozambique
 Culture of Rwanda
 Culture of Seychelles
 Culture of Somalia
 Culture of South Sudan
 Culture of Tanzania
 Culture of Uganda
 Culture of Zambia
 Culture of Zimbabwe
 Southern Africa
 Culture of Botswana
 Culture of Lesotho
 Culture of Namibia
 Culture of South Africa
 Culture of Swaziland
 Dependencies in Africa
 Culture of the British Indian Ocean Territory (UK)
 Culture of Mayotte (France)
 Culture of Réunion (France)
 Culture of Saint Helena (UK)
 Culture of the Canary Islands (Spain)
 Culture of Ceuta (Spain)
 Culture of Madeira (Portugal)
 Culture of Melilla (Spain)
 Culture of Socotra (Yemen)
 Culture of Puntland
 Culture of Somaliland
 Culture of the Sahrawi Arab Democratic Republic

Culture of Antarctica 
 No political divisions and no permanent population

Cultures of Asia 

Culture of Asia
 Central Asia
 Culture of Kazakhstan
 Culture of Kyrgyzstan
 Culture of Tajikistan
 Culture of Turkmenistan
 Culture of Uzbekistan
 East Asia
 Culture of China
 Culture of Tibet
 Special Administrative regions of China
 Culture of Hong Kong
 Culture of Macau
 Culture of Japan
 Culture of North Korea
 Culture of South Korea
 Culture of Mongolia
 Culture of Taiwan
 North Asia
 Culture of Russia
 Southeast Asia
 Culture of Brunei
 Culture of Burma
 Culture of Cambodia
 Culture of East Timor
 Culture of Indonesia
 Culture of Laos
 Culture of Malaysia
 Culture of the Philippines
 Culture of Singapore
 Culture of Thailand
 Culture of Vietnam
 South Asia
 Culture of Afghanistan
 Culture of Bangladesh
 Culture of Bhutan
 Culture of India
 Culture of Iran
 Culture of Maldives
 Culture of Nepal
 Culture of Pakistan
 Culture of Sri Lanka
 West Asia
 Culture of Armenia
 Culture of Azerbaijan
 Culture of Bahrain
 Culture of Cyprus
 Culture of Northern Cyprus
 Culture of Georgia
 Culture of Iraq
 Culture of Israel
 Culture of Jordan
 Culture of Kuwait
 Culture of Lebanon
 Culture of Oman
 Culture of Palestine
 Culture of Qatar
 Culture of Saudi Arabia
 Culture of Syria
 Culture of Turkey
 Culture of the United Arab Emirates
 Culture of Yemen

Cultures of the Caucasus 
(a region considered to be in both Asia and Europe or between them)

 North Caucasus
 Parts of Russia
 Culture of Chechnya
 Culture of Ingushetia
 Culture of Dagestan
 Culture of Adyghea
 Culture of Kabardino-Balkaria
 Culture of Karachay–Cherkessia
 Culture of North Ossetia
 Culture of Krasnodar Krai
 Culture of Stavropol Krai
 South Caucasus
 Culture of Georgia
 Culture of Abkhazia
 Culture of South Ossetia
 Culture of Armenia
 Culture of Azerbaijan
 Culture of Nagorno-Karabakh

Cultures of Europe 

Culture of Europe
 Culture of Akrotiri and Dhekelia
 Culture of Åland
 Culture of Albania
 Culture of Andorra
 Culture of Armenia
 Culture of Austria
 Culture of Azerbaijan
 Culture of Belarus
 Culture of Belgium
 Culture of Bosnia and Herzegovina
 Culture of Bulgaria
 Culture of Croatia
 Culture of Cyprus
 Culture of the Czech Republic
 Culture of Denmark
 Culture of Estonia
 Culture of the Faroe Islands
 Culture of Finland
 Culture of France
 Culture of Georgia
 Culture of Germany
 Culture of Gibraltar
 Culture of Greece
 Culture of Guernsey
 Culture of Hungary
 Culture of Iceland
 Culture of the Republic of Ireland
 Culture of the Isle of Man
 Culture of Italy
 Culture of Jersey
 Culture of Kazakhstan
 Culture of Kosovo
 Culture of Latvia
 Culture of Liechtenstein
 Culture of Lithuania
 Culture of Luxembourg
 Culture of Malta
 Culture of Moldova
 Culture of Transnistria
 Culture of Monaco
 Culture of Montenegro
 Culture of the Netherlands
 Culture of North Macedonia
 Culture of Norway
 Culture of Poland
 Culture of Portugal
 Culture of Romania
 Culture of Russia
 Culture of San Marino
 Culture of Serbia
 Culture of Slovakia
 Culture of Slovenia
 Culture of Spain
 Culture of Svalbard
 Culture of Sweden
 Culture of Switzerland
 Culture of Turkey
 Culture of Ukraine
 Culture of the United Kingdom
 Culture of England
 Culture of Cornwall
 Culture of Sussex
 Culture of Yorkshire
 Culture of Northern Ireland
 Culture of Scotland
 Culture of Wales
 Culture of Vatican City
 Culture of the European Union

Cultures of North America 

Culture of North America
 Culture of Canada
 Culture of Alberta
 Culture of British Columbia
 Culture of Manitoba
 Culture of New Brunswick
 Culture of Newfoundland and Labrador
 Culture of Nova Scotia
 Culture of Ontario
 Culture of Prince Edward Island
 Culture of Quebec
 Culture of Saskatchewan
 Culture of Greenland
 Culture of Mexico
 Culture of Saint Pierre and Miquelon
 Culture of the United States
 Culture of Alabama
 Culture of Alaska
 Culture of Arizona
 Culture of Arkansas
 Culture of California
 Culture of Colorado
 Culture of Connecticut
 Culture of Delaware
 Culture of Florida
 Culture of Georgia
 Culture of Hawaii
 Culture of Idaho
 Culture of Illinois
 Culture of Indiana
 Culture of Iowa
 Culture of Montana
 Culture of Kansas
 Culture of Kentucky
 Culture of Louisiana
 Culture of Maine
 Culture of Maryland
 Culture of Massachusetts
 Culture of Michigan
 Culture of Minnesota
 Culture of Mississippi
 Culture of Missouri
 Culture of Nebraska
 Culture of Nevada
 Culture of New Hampshire
 Culture of New Jersey
 Culture of New Mexico
 Culture of New York
 Culture of North Carolina
 Culture of North Dakota
 Culture of Ohio
 Culture of Oklahoma
 Culture of Oregon
 Culture of Pennsylvania
 Culture of Rhode Island
 Culture of South Carolina
 Culture of South Dakota
 Culture of Tennessee
 Culture of Texas
 Culture of Utah
 Culture of Vermont
 Culture of Virginia
 Culture of Washington
 Culture of West Virginia
 Culture of Wisconsin
 Culture of Wyoming
 Culture of Washington, D.C.
 Central America
 Culture of Belize
 Culture of Costa Rica
 Culture of El Salvador
 Culture of Guatemala
 Culture of Honduras
 Culture of Nicaragua
 Culture of Panama
 Caribbean
 Culture of Anguilla
 Culture of Antigua and Barbuda
 Culture of Aruba
 Culture of the Bahamas
 Culture of Barbados
 Culture of Bermuda
 Culture of the British Virgin Islands
 Culture of the Cayman Islands
 Culture of Cuba
 Culture of Dominica
 Culture of the Dominican Republic
 Culture of Grenada
 Culture of Guadeloupe
 Culture of Haiti
 Culture of Jamaica
 Culture of Martinique
 Culture of Montserrat
 Culture of Navassa Island
 Culture of the Netherlands Antilles
 Culture of Puerto Rico
 Culture of Saint Barthélemy
 Culture of Saint Kitts and Nevis
 Culture of Saint Lucia
 Culture of Saint Martin
 Culture of Saint Vincent and the Grenadines
 Culture of Trinidad and Tobago
 Culture of the Turks and Caicos Islands
 Culture of the United States Virgin Islands

Cultures of Oceania 

Culture of Oceania
 Australasia
 Culture of Australia
 Dependencies/Territories of Australia
 Culture of Christmas Island
 Culture of the Cocos (Keeling) Islands
 Culture of Norfolk Island
 Culture of New Zealand
 Melanesia
 Culture of Fiji
 Culture of Indonesia
 Culture of New Caledonia (France)
 Culture of Papua New Guinea
 Culture of the Solomon Islands
 Culture of Vanuatu
 Micronesia
 Culture of the Federated States of Micronesia
 Culture of Guam (USA)
 Culture of Kiribati
 Culture of the Marshall Islands
 Culture of Nauru
 Culture of the Northern Mariana Islands (USA)
 Culture of Palau
 Culture of Wake Island (USA)
 Polynesia
 Culture of American Samoa (USA)
 Culture of the Chatham Islands (NZ)
 Culture of the Cook Islands (NZ)
 Culture of Easter Island (Chile)
 Culture of French Polynesia (France)
 Culture of Hawaii (USA)
 Culture of the Loyalty Islands (France)
 Culture of Niue (NZ)
 Culture of the Pitcairn Islands (UK)
 Culture of Adamstown
 Culture of Samoa
 Culture of Tokelau (NZ)
 Culture of Tonga
 Culture of Tuvalu
 Culture of Wallis and Futuna (France)

Cultures of South America 

Culture of South America
 Culture of Argentina
 Culture of Bolivia
 Culture of Brazil
 Culture of Chile
 Culture of Colombia
 Culture of Ecuador
 Culture of the Falkland Islands
 Culture of French Guiana
 Culture of Guyana
 Culture of Paraguay
 Culture of Peru
 Culture of Suriname
 Culture of Uruguay
 Culture of Venezuela

Cultures of the South America 

 Culture of Ascension Island
 Culture of Saint Helena
 Culture of Tristan da Cunha

History of culture

Cultural histories

By period 
 Culture during the Cold War

By region 
 Cultural history of the United States
 Cultural history of Taiwan
 History of Lithuanian culture
 History of Russian culture

By subject 
 Earth in culture
 World War II in contemporary culture
 Medieval maritime culture

Historical cultures
 Culture of ancient China
 Culture of ancient Greece
 Culture of ancient Rome
 Culture of ancient Rus
 Clovis culture
 Mississippian culture
 Vinca culture
 Human sacrifice in Aztec culture

Politics of culture 

 The arts and politics – as they respond to contemporaneous events and politics, the arts take on political as well as social dimensions, becoming themselves a focus of controversy and even a force of political as well as social change.
 Culture change –
 Culture of fear –
 Culture of life –
 Culture minister –
 Official culture –
 Political culture –

Sociology of culture 
 Animal culture –
 Constructed culture –
 Counterculture –
 Cross-cultural communication –
 Cultural bias –
 Cultural dissonance –
 Cultural evolution –
 Cultural icon –
 Cultural imperialism –
 Cultural movement –
 Cultural phenomenon –
 Cultural system –
 Cultural universals –
 Culture assimilators –
 Culture clash 
 Culture gap –
 Culture hero –
 Culture industry –
 Culture note –
 Culture of poverty –
 Culture shock –
 Culture theory –
 Culture speculation –
 Culture war –
 Death and culture –
 Demographics –
 Emotions and Culture –
 Ethnocentrism –
 High culture –
 Intercultural competence –
 Low culture –
 Right to science and culture –
 Social fact –
 Symbolic culture –
 Third culture kid –
 Transformation of culture –
 Trash culture –
 Urban culture –

Research fields 
 Semiotics of culture – studies culture in relation to language and as a symbolic system of signs

See also 

Bread and circuses
 Ethnocentrism
Cultural Institutions Studies
Culture 21 – The Agenda 21 plan of action applied to Culture
Fads
Interculturality
Lifestyle
MTV Generation
Netflix
One-Dimensional Man
Pop art
Pop icon

References 

Culture
Culture
Culture